Sabaragamuwa Province is a province of Sri Lanka, containing the Kegalle District and Ratnapura District. The following is a list of settlements in the province.



A
Abuwangala, Adavikanda, Adawikanda, Adikariya, Agalagama, Agalagamuwa, Agalawatta, Agalekumbura, Agaregama, Ahaspokuna, Ahuliyadda, Akarella, Akurana, Akurugegangoda, Akwatta, Alagalkanda, Alagalla, Alakolaella, Alankarapanguwa, Alapaladeniya, Alapalawala, Alawala, Alawatura, Alawwa, Aldora, Algama, Algama Egodagama, Algama Ihalagama, Algama Medagama, Algoda, Alkegama, Allagalla, Alpitiya, Aludeniya, Aluketiya, Alupatgala, Alupola, Alupota, Alutnuwara, Amanawala, Amarakonmulla, Amarakoonmulla, Ambagahakanda, Ambagala, Ambakumbura, Ambalakanda, Ambalanpitiya, Ambalanyaya, Ambamalla, Ambanpitiya, Ambatenna, Ambawala, Ambepussa, Ambulugala, Ambuwakka, Ambuwangala, Amitirigala, Ammuduwa, Ampagala, Ampana, Ampe, Amuhenkanda, Amunumulla, Amunutenna, Amupitiya, Amutagoda, Amuwatta, Amuwatugoda, Andadola, Andanawa, Andaoluwa, Andiramada, Andiyamalatenna, Andoluwa, Anduwawala, Angammana, Anghandiya, Angoda, Angodakanda, Anguruwawala, Anguruwella, Anhandiya, Anhettigama, Anwarama, Arabboda, Arachchikumbura, Arama, Arambegama, Aranayaka, Arandara, Arawegoda, Aruggammana, Aruggoda, Arukgammana, Arukmulla, Aruppala, Asamanakanda, Asgangula, Asideniya, Asmadala, Assedduma, Asseddungoda, Asseddunwela, Atakalanpanne, Atalawa, Atale, Atallawela, Ataudakanda, Athalawa, Attanagoda, Attapitiya, Atugoda, Atulugama, Aturaliya, Aturupana, Ayagama

B
Badahela, Badahelagoda, Badahelgoda, Badanamure, Badullawala, Badullegama, Badulupitiya, Baduwalakanda, Bagature, Bakmideniya, Bakulwala, Balagangoda, Balaharuwa, Balakottunna, Balakotuwa, Balangoda, Balatgomuwa, Balavinna, Balawane, Balawatgama, Balawathgama, Balawinna, Balibatgoda, Balibathgoda, Balinduwawa, Ballahela, Ballapana, Ballapanatenna, Bambarabotuwa, Bambarabotuwegkanda, Bambaragala, Bambaragama, Bambaragastenna, Bampane, Bamunagammana, Bamunaulla, Banagoda, Basnagala, Basnagoda, Batadure, Bataendiriya, Batakada, Batambure, Batangala, Batatota, Batawala, Batayaya, Batepola, Batewela, Batgangoda, Batugedara, Batugedera, Batupitiya, Batuwana, Batuwatta, Batuwita, Beddawala, Belgoda, Beligala, Beligammana, Beligoda, Beligodapitiya, Belihul Oya, Belihulwana, Beliketiya, Belimaliyadda, Bellangama, Bellankanda, Beminiwatta, Bendaluwa, Beragala, Berannawa, Berendeniya, Berenduwa, Berranawa, Beruwala, Betmegedara, Bewila, Bewilehena, Bibila, Bibilegama, Binnegama, Bintenigolla, Bisowela, Bodawala, Bodimalgoda, Bodimaluwa, Bogahakumbura, Bogahakumburuwela, Bogala, Bogamuwa, Bogoda-aramba, Bohara, Bohettiya, Bohora, Bokolamulla, Bolagama, Boltumbe, Bopetta, Bopitigoda, Bopitiya, Boralankanda, Boranjamuwa, Boruggamuwa, Bossella, Botiyatenna, Bowalgaha, Bowatta, Boyagama, Boyagoda, Budawatta, Budunwela, Bulatgama, Bulathkohupitiya, Bulatkohupitiya, Bulatwatta, Bulatwelgoda, Bulatwelkanda, Bulugahapitiya, Bulugammana, Buluruppa, Bulutota, Buluwana, Bungeriya, Bungiriya, Burunnawa, Buthkanda, Butkanda

C
Colombage-ara

D
Dadayankanda, Dahenpahuwa, Dalumurawatta, Damahana, Dambawinna, Dambemada, Dambulla, Dambuluwana, Damme, Dampelgoda, Damunupola, Danagama, Dandawa, Dandeniya Pahala, Dangampala, Dankolagune, Dankumbura, Dannoruwa, Daswatta, Davulkaragoda, Dayigala Ihala, Dayigala Pahala, Debagama, Debathgama, Dedigama, Dedugala, Degalaeriya, Deharagoda, Dehenakanda, Deheragoda, Dehigahapitiya, Dehigampala, Dehigastalawa, Dehimaduwa, Dehiowita, Dehipahala, Dehipitiya, Deiyagala, Dela, Delarawa, Deldeniya, Delgahagoda, Delgahatenna, Delgamuwa, Delgoda, Delgomuwa, Deliwala, Dellaboda, Deloluwa, Delpatdeniya, Delpothdeniya, Delwala, Demada, Demalahiriya, Demanagammana, Dembatanpitiya, Demodara, Denagama, Denawaka Patakada, Denawaka Udakada, Denawakawatta, Denihena, Denuwakanda, Depedene, Deraniyagala, Dessepota, Detabodakanda, Detawala, Devanagala, Dewalagama, Dewanagala, Dewaragampola, Digadure, Digalla, Diganakanda, Digogedara, Digowa, Dikelikanda, Dikella, Dikellekanda, Dimbulgamuwa, Dimbulwala, Dimiyawa, Dimiyawegodella, Dippitigala, Dippitiya, Divurumpitiya, Diwala Pallegama, Diwala Udagama, Diwelgama, Diyabibile, Diyagala, Diyagama, Diyahitiyawala, Diyainna, Diyapota, Diyasunnata, Diyawinna, Dodammuluwa, Dodampe, Dodampegoda, Dodampitiya, Dodantale, Dodawatta, Dolekanda, Doloswala, Doloswalkanda, Dombagammana, Dombagaswinna, Dombemada, Dombepola, Dompemulla, Dompitiya, Dooldeniya, Doolgala, Doranuwa, Dorapane, Dorawaka, Dorawela, Duldeniya, Dumbara, Dumbuluwa, Dumbuluwawa, Dumbuluwawaka, Dumbuluwewa, Dummaladeniya, Dunugama, Dunukewala, Dunumale, Dunumandalawa, Duragekanda, Durakanda

E
Ebetota, Ebidigala, Edanduwawa, Edurapola, Edurapota, Egalla, Egallekanda, Eggodakanda, Egodagoda, Egodakanda, Egodawatugoda, Egolla, Ehalagaha-arawa, Ehelekumbura, Eheliyagoda, Ekiriyagala, Ekneligoda, Ela-Ihala, Elagalla, Elamaideniya, Elamalpe, Elangipitiya, Elapata, Elibodakanda, Ella, Ellawala, Ellawala Ihalagama, Ellawala Pahalagama, Ellearawa, Ellegedara, Ellehena, Ellekanda, Ellepola, Ellewatta, Elugala, Elugalla, Eluwana, Eluwana, Embilipitiya, Embilipitiya Pallegama, Embilmiwala, Embuldeniya, Embulmiwala, Emitiyagoda, Endana, Endirikele, Endiriyanwala, Epalapitiya, Epalatotuwa, Epalawa, Epitawala, Eppelapitiya, Erabadda, Erabadupela, Erabedda, Erabudupitiya, Erabuduwala, Eraminigammana, Eratnagoda, Eregama, Erepola, Ereporuwa, Ereporuwa, Erevupola, Eriyawa, Etaheraliyagoda, Etawakwala, Etnawala, Etoya, Evunugalla

G
Gabbala, Gabbela, Gabbelawatta, Gadapola, Galadeniya, Galahitigama, Galahitiya, Galamella, Galapahalagama, Galapaya, Galapitamada, Galapitimada, Galatara, Galaudakanda, Galayatakanatta, Galboda, Galbokaya, Galenda, Galgomuwa, Galkaduwa, Galkanda, Galkandagoda, Galkerekanda, Galketiya, Gallassapola, Gallela, Gallelletota, Gallenakanda, Gallinna, Galpallelanda, Galpata, Galpaya, Galpola, Galukagama, Galwalagoda, Gamagepetta, Gamekkanda, Gamikkanda, Gammanagoda, Gammannagoda, Gammedda, Gampalawalakada, Ganegama, Ganegangoda, Ganegoda, Gangalagomuwa, Gangekumbura, Gangoda, Gangodagama, Gangodakanda, Gangodakumbura, Gangulwitiya, Ganitapura, Ganithapura, Gansabhawa, Gantuna Pallegama, Gantuna Udagama, Gantune-Pallegama, Gantune-Udagama, Garagoda, Gasnawa, Gawaragiriya, Gayirenagama, Gerandiella, Gerapatgama, Getaberikanda, Getahetta, Getamuruta, Getangama, Getiyamulla, Gevilipitiya, Gilimale, Ginihappitiya, Ginitillawala, Giramadola, Glenella, Godagama, Godagampola, Godagandeniya, Godagedara, Godakawela, Godakumbura, Godapola, Godawela, Godayakanda, Godella, Godigamuwa, Golahela, Gomaduwa, Gomiarawa, Gonagala, Gonagaldeniya, Gonagomuwa, Gonakumbura, Gonapitiya, Gonaramba, Gonawala, Gondiwala, Gorokgahamada, Gulanekanda, Guriyamba, Gurubewila, Gurubewilagama, Gurugalla, Gurulawella, Guruluwana

H
Haalmessa, Habalakkawa, Habbeliara, Habbunkaduwa, Hakahinna, Hakamuwa, Hakurugammana, Hakuruliyadda, Halagiriya, Halaturakele

I
Idampitiya, Idangoda, Iddamalgoda, Iddawala, Iduranpitiya, Ihala Dayigala, Ihala Kalugala, Ihala Pohorabawa, Ihalagalagama, Ihalagama, Ihalakanda, Ihalakotte, Ilipangamuwa, Illukpitiya, Illuktenna, Ilubbuluwa, Ilukgoda, Ilukkumbura, Ilukkumburagoda, Ilukkumburugoda, Ilukpitiya, Iluktenna, Ilwana, Imbulamura, Imbulana, Imbulgala, Imbulgoda, Imbulhititenna, Imbulpe, Imbulpitiya, Imekanda, Imewatta, Indikatupana, Indolewatta, Indurana, Induranpitiya, Induruwa, Ingiriyawatta, Iriyamaditta, Iriyaulla, Ittekanda

J
Jatunkanda, Jeewana, Jeewandeniya, Jiwana, Jiwanadeniya

K
Kabagamuwa, Kabulumulla, Kachchigala, Kadadora, Kadadorakanda, Kadawatakanda, Kadawattiya, Kadigamuwa, Kadigomuwa, Kadigomuwa

L
Labugama, Lahupane, Lakmana, Lambutuwa, Landuyaya, Lassegama, Lassekanda, Leeniyagala, Lekamagoda, Lekamgoda, Lekangoda, Lellagoda, Lellopitiya, Lenagala, Lenagala Ihala, Lenagala Pahala, Lendaramulla, Lessagama, Leuke, Lewala, Lewangama Dumbuluwa, Lewangama Pahalagama, Lewangama Talawatta, Lewangama Udagammedda, Liniyagala, Liniyakaduwa, Liyana-arachchigama, Liyanagegama, Liyandawela, Liyangahatota, Liyangastota, Lolgoda

M
Maboda, Mabopitiya, Madagammana, Madakandura, Madalagama, Madalagama, Madampe, Madana, Madare

N
Naberiyawa, Nabuluwa, Nabuluwa, Nadeniya, Nagoda, Nagomuwa, Nahalwatura, Nahitiya, Nakandala, Nakkawita

O
Obokka, Oddape, Oddare, Okanmulla, Olagama, Olitenna, Olugala, Olugantota, Omalpe, Opanake, Opata, Opata, Opata, Opatha, Otnapitiya, Owala, Owala Kudabage, Owala Mahabage, Owatta, Owatta, Owatura, Owitigamuwa, Owitiwara

P
Padalangala, Padawigampola, Padidora, Padugama, Pagalowita, Pagoda, Pahala Dayigala, Pahala Hinguruwaka, Pahala Kalugala, Pahala Pohorabawa

R
Rabbidigala, Radagoda, Raddella, Ragala, Ragalkanda, Rahala, Rajawaka, Rakwana, Rambuka, Rambukanagama

S
Sannasgama, Selawa, Silanarawa, Silogama, Singagoda, Singahagoda, Singappulikanda, Sinhalagoda, Sitagalapanguwa, Sitagangula, Siyambalangamuwa, Siyambalapitiya, Siyambalapitiya, Siyambalapitiya, Siyambalawa, Siyambalawala, Siyambalawala, Sudagala, Suduhakurukanda, Suriyakanda, Rassagala

T
Talagahawatta, Talagahayaya, Talagaskanda, Talangama, Talangama, Talapitiya, Talapitiya, Talawatta, Taldewa, Talduwa

U
Uda Beddewala, Uda Beddewela, Uda Dadayankanda, Uda Galadeniya, Uda Hinguruwaka, Uda Karandupone, Uda Pamunuwa, Uda Yogama, Udabage, Udagama

V
Veddagala

W
Wadakahadeniya, Wadamaldeniya, Waddeniya, Wadiyatenna, Wadukanda, Wadumulla, Wadupola, Waduwadeniya, Waduwawela, Waguregama

See also
 List of cities in Sri Lanka
 List of towns in Sri Lanka

External links
 Cities and Towns in Province of Sabaragamuwa, Sri Lanka

 
Sabaragamuwa
Sabaragamuwa